Below is a list of the New Zealand National Basketball League (NBL) champions. The NBL's championship round has predominantly been a one-game decider, with the exception being 1995–97 and 2007–10 when a best-of-three finals series was used. The Wellington Saints have won a league-best 12 championships to go with 20 appearances in the championship round.

Champions

Results by team

See also
Conference Basketball League
New Zealand NBL Finals Most Valuable Player Award

References

External links
List of NBL champions at NZNBL.Basketball

champions
NZNBL